Roy Inglof Hansen (March 6, 1898 – February 9, 1977) was a pitcher in Major League Baseball. He played for the Washington Senators in 1918.

References

External links

1898 births
1977 deaths
Major League Baseball pitchers
Washington Senators (1901–1960) players
Baseball players from Wisconsin
Sportspeople from Beloit, Wisconsin